Callum Craig Doyle (born 3 October 2003) is an English professional footballer who plays for Coventry City, on loan from Manchester City, as a defender.

Club career
Doyle began his career with Manchester City, moving on loan to Sunderland in July 2021. He made his professional debut on 7 August 2021, in a 2–1 league victory against Wigan Athletic, and he scored his first professional goal on 30 December 2021, in a 5-0 league win against Sheffield Wednesday. He made 44 appearances for the club in all competitions, as the club won promotion to the Championship via the play-offs.

On 12 July 2022, Doyle joined Championship club Coventry City on another season-long loan.

International career
Having represented England U18s, Doyle made his debut for the England U19s during a 2–0 victory over Italy U19s at St. George's Park on 2 September 2021.

On 17 June 2022, Doyle was included in the England U19 squad for the 2022 UEFA European Under-19 Championship. The England team won the tournament, beating Israel 3–1 in the final, with Doyle scoring England's first goal in that match.

Career statistics

Honours

Sunderland
 EFL League One play-offs: 2022

England U19s
 UEFA European Under-19 Championship: 2022

References

External links

2003 births
Living people
English footballers
Manchester City F.C. players
Sunderland A.F.C. players
Coventry City F.C. players
English Football League players
Association football defenders
England youth international footballers